Sabitha Beegam is the first Muslim Mayor in India. She became the first mayor of Kollam Corporation at the age of 23. She is a lawyer, social worker and CPI(M) politician from Kollam.

Life 
Sabitha Beegam was born to MV Mohammed Kunju and Meharban on 29 May 1977. She did her Bachelors in Arts from TKM Arts and Science College, Kollam. She then pursued LLB from Government Law College, Trivandrum.

Politics 
Sabitha Beegam is a politician from Communist Party of India (Marxist). She joined AIDWA in 1995. She is currently the state joint secretary of All India Democratic Women's Association in Kerala and an area committee member of the party at Kollam.

In 2010, she was defeated by Maya Gopikrishnan from Congress by a margin of nine votes.

Sabitha was the youngest Mayor elected in the history of any of the city corporations in Kerala. In 2020 her record was replaced by Arya Rajendran, the 21 year old Mayor of Thiruvananthapuram Corporation.

References

Kerala municipal councillors
Mayors of places in Kerala
Living people
Communist Party of India (Marxist) politicians from Kerala
Social workers
21st-century Indian women lawyers
Politicians from Kollam
21st-century Indian women scientists
21st-century Indian scientists
20th-century Indian women scientists
20th-century Indian scientists
20th-century Indian educators
21st-century Indian educators
21st-century Indian lawyers
Women mayors of places in Kerala
21st-century Indian women politicians
21st-century Indian politicians
Social workers from Kerala
Year of birth missing (living people)
Women educators from Kerala
Educators from Kerala
21st-century women educators